Incilius cristatus (formerly Bufo cristatus), the large-crested toad, is an endangered species of true toad that is endemic to cloud forests in the central Sierra Madre Oriental in Puebla and Veracruz, Mexico. Once feared extinct, it has recently been rediscovered at two sites in Puebla where it is uncommon. The reasons for its decline are habitat loss and pollution, and there are no recent records from Veracruz.

References

External links

 https://web.archive.org/web/20110521192148/http://www.odemagazine.com/exchange/3919/fundraising_for_frogs

cristatus
Endemic amphibians of Mexico
Fauna of the Sierra Madre Oriental
Amphibians described in 1833
Taxa named by Arend Friedrich August Wiegmann